Kajaki() is a district in the Northeast of Helmand Province, Afghanistan. Its population is by a vast majority Pashtun, and stood at 69,300 in 2012. The district centre is the village of Kajaki. Route 611 passes through the district to the district center.

References

External links 

 Map of Settlements AIMS, 2002

See also 
 Districts of Afghanistan

Districts of Helmand Province